Sherrie Jean Tucker (born 18 March 1957 Modesto, California) is a musicologist, music historian, book author, professor, and journal editor.  Tucker is co-editor-in-chief of American Studies, peer-reviewed academic journal.

Education 

Tucker holds three degrees from San Francisco State University, including: a BA in Creative Writing, graduating summa cum laude in 1991, an MA in Creative Writing in 1992, and an MA in Women's Studies in 1994. Tucker earned a Ph.D. from the University of California, Santa Cruz, in History of Consciousness in 1999.

Academic career 

From 1999 to 2001, Tucker was assistant professor of women's studies at Hobart and William Smith Colleges, Geneva, New York.  Since 2001, Tucker has been a member of the faculty associated with American studies at the University of Kansas, Lawrence.  From 2001 to 2004, she was assistant professor; from 2004 to 2013 she was associate professor; and from 2013 to present she has been professor.  From 2004 to 2005, Tucker was the Louis Armstrong Visiting Professor at the Center for Jazz Studies, Columbia University.

Selected works 

Books
 
 
 

Articles

Research Collectives

Women Who Rock: Making Scenes, Building Communities Oral History Archive.

References

External links 

 Professor Tucker's official website at the University of Kansas

1957 births
Living people
American music historians
American jazz educators
American musicologists
American women musicologists
San Francisco State University alumni
University of California, Santa Cruz
University of Kansas faculty
Women music educators
American women historians
21st-century American women